
Broome  may refer to:

Places

Australia
Broome, Western Australia
Broome International Airport
Broome Tramway
Roman Catholic Diocese of Broome
Shire of Broome
Attack on Broome during World War II

United Kingdom
Broome Park, Kent
Broome, Norfolk
Broome, Shropshire
Broome, Worcestershire

United States
Broome, New York
Broome County, New York
Broome, Texas
Broome Street, New York City

Ships
 HMAS Broome (ACPB 90), an Armidale class patrol boat
 HMAS Broome (J191), a Bathurst class corvette
 USS Broome (DD-210), a Clemson class destroyer

Other uses
 Broome (name)
 Broome Sandstone, a Mesozoic geologic formation
 Broome (horse), thoroughbred racehorse

See also
 Brome (disambiguation)
 Broom (disambiguation)